Lashkajan or Lashka Jan may refer to:
 Lashkajan-e Olya
 Lashkajan-e Sofla